Jiong Qiu is a Chinese-born American astrophysicist who won the Karen Harvey Prize for her work in solar flares.

Academic career 
Qiu completed her Bachelors of Science in Astronomy in 1993 at Nanjing University located in Jiangsu, China. Five years later she was awarded her PhD from the same university for her observational work in solar flares. Between acquiring her Bachelors and her PhD, between 1996–1997, she obtained a student fellowship that allowed her to work at Arcetri Astrophysics Observatory in Italy.

Following her PhD, Qiu was accepted as a postdoc with the Big Bear Solar Observatory in California to further investigate solar flares, and to begin directly monitoring the Earth's atmosphere via measurements of Earthshine.

In 2005, she accepted a position with Montana State University, in Bozeman, Montana, as an assistant professor in Physics and Astronomy.

Scientific work 
Qiu has added contributed to the fields of Heliophysics, Heliodynamics, and the Atmospheric sciences. She currently works with the Solar Physics Group at Montana State University. Her current research interests are: 
 Magnetic Reconnection and Energy Release in Solar Flares
 Large-scale solar magnetic reconfiguration 
 Small-scale Active Region Energy Release Events
 Particle Acceleration in Flare Environment
 Dynamics of Solar Flares and Active Regions
 Earthshine Measurements of Global Atmospheric Change

Her current research is centered on solar eruption events, and focused on understanding magnetic reconnection during these explosive events, using both ground-based telescopes and satellites.

Awards 
In addition to receiving grants from the National Science Foundation and NASA, Qiu was the 2007 recipient of the Karen Harvey Prize for her major contributions to scientific understanding of the Sun, its effects on the atmosphere of the Earth, and its effects on Earth's climate.

Publications

References

Year of birth missing (living people)
Living people
Nanjing University alumni
Women astronomers